Veritas is the name given to the Roman virtue of truthfulness, which was considered one of the main virtues any good Roman should possess. The Greek goddess of truth is Aletheia. The German philosopher Martin Heidegger argues that the truth represented by aletheia (which essentially means "unconcealment") is different from that represented by veritas, which is linked to a Roman understanding of rightness and finally to a Nietzschean sense of justice and a will to power.

In Roman mythology, Veritas, meaning Truth, is the Goddess of Truth, a daughter of Saturn (called Cronus by the Greeks, the Titan of Time, perhaps first by Plutarch), and the mother of Virtus. She is also sometimes considered the daughter of Jupiter (called Zeus by the Greeks), or a creation of Prometheus. The elusive goddess is said to have hidden in the bottom of a holy well. She is depicted both as a virgin dressed in white and as the "naked truth" (nuda veritas) holding a hand mirror.

In Western culture, the word may also serve as a motto.

Mottos
This Latin word "veritas" now appears in the mottos of many colleges, universities and other diverse organizations. It is typically capitalized in mottoes (as "Veritas") for being an ideal (such as: Truth, Kindness and Beauty).  Veritas is the motto of Harvard University, Hutchesons' Grammar School, The University of Western Ontario, Drake University, Knox College (Illinois), Bilkent University, the University of California - Hastings College of the Law, as well as the Dominican Order of the Roman Catholic Church, and Providence College and Molloy College which is run by the Dominicans. "Veritas" is also the motto of Loyola College, Ibadan in Nigeria. Loyola College was established by the Roman Catholic Church and named for St. Ignatius of Loyola. Additionally, the word appears in mottoes that are phrases, or lists e.g. the Buckley School of the City of New York employs the phrase Honor et Veritas, the University of Indonesia's motto is "Veritas, Probitas, Iustitia", the University of Cape Coast in Ghana's motto is "Veritas Nobis Lumen", the University of Michigan's motto is: "Artes, Scientia, Veritas". Doshisha University in Kyoto, Japan's motto is "Veritas Liberabit Vos". "Veritas vos liberabit" ("The Truth Will Set You Free") is the motto of The Johns Hopkins University and St Thomas' College (Autonomous), Thrissur, the first Catholic college in Kerala. Verbum Tuum Veritas ("Your Word is Truth") is the motto of Monkton Combe School.

Caldwell College in Caldwell, New Jersey issues a "Veritas Award" each year in honor of the Dominican Sisters who founded and administer the college. "Veritas" is included in the motto of Indiana University and Yale University, Lux et Veritas ("Light and Truth"). It also appears on the California State University's motto Vox Veritas Vita ("Speak the Truth as a way of Life").  Veritas Curat ("Truth Cures") is the motto of the Jawaharlal Institute of Postgraduate Medical Education and Research, a medical school in Puducherry, India. Howard University, in Washington, D.C., goes by the motto "Veritas et Utilitas", translated to "Truth and Service", which is also a motto "Truth-Service" of Payap University, Thailand. It also exists in the logo of Seoul National University, Korea: "Veritas Lux Mea" – meaning "Truth is my light". Villanova University also uses Veritas in its school motto, Veritas, Unitas, Caritas ("Truth, Unity, Love"). Uppsala University in Sweden also uses Veritas in its school motto, "Gratiae veritas naturae".

The Naval Criminal Investigative Service, the U.S. Navy's primary counterintelligence arm and law enforcement agency, uses the motto on its official seal. 

The American communications company Verizon has its name derive from the combination of the words  and horizon - chosen from 8,500 candidates with $300 million spent on marketing the new brand. Other companies deriving their name from Veritas include Vertex Pharmaceuticals and Verily.

See also
 In vino veritas
 Via, Veritas, Vita
 John 8:32
 John 18:38
 Truth Coming Out of Her Well
 Urim and Thummim
 490 Veritas
 Project Veritas

Notes

External links

 History of Truth: The Latin "Veritas"
 Aletheia and Other Terms for Truth in Ancient Greek—Origins and developments of the concept of Truth (From the Greek "Aletheia" to the Latin "Veritas")

Latin words and phrases
Personifications in Roman mythology
Roman goddesses
Truth
Children of Zeus